The 1961 Australia rugby union tour of Southern Africa was a series of six rugby union matches played by the Wallabies in July and August 1961.

The test series was won by the Springboks with two wins from two matches.

Matches 
Scores and results list Wallaibies' points tally first.

Touring party
Tour Manager: Bjarne Halvorsen (NSW) 
Captain/Coach: Ken Catchpole (NSW)

Michael Cleary (NSW)
John Dowse (NSW)
Owen Edwards (QLD)
Beres Elwood (NSW)
Ted Heinrich (NSW)
Rob Heming (NSW)
Peter Johnson (NSW)
Jim Lenehan (NSW)
Jim Lisle (NSW) 
Graeme MacDougall (NSW)
Don McDeed (NSW)
Ted Magrath (NSW)
Tony Miller (NSW)
John O'Gorman (NSW)
Rod Phelps (NSW)
Terry Reid (NSW)
Harry Roberts (QLD)
John Thornett (NSW)
Dick Thornett (NSW)
Jon White (NSW)

References 

Australia national rugby union team tours
1961
Tour
tour